France and Italy have played each other at rugby union a total of 47 matches, with France winning 44 times, Italy winning 3 times, and no matches drawn. Since 2007, the winner of the meeting between the teams in the Six Nations Tournament has received the Giuseppe Garibaldi Trophy.

Summary
Note: Summary below reflects test results by both teams.

Records
Note: Date shown in brackets indicates when the record was or last set.

Results

XV Results
Below are a list of matches that Italy has awarded matches test match status by virtue of awarding caps, but France did not award caps.

References

 
France national rugby union team matches
Italy national rugby union team matches
Rugby union rivalries in France
Rugby union rivalries in Italy
Six Nations Championship